Linn County was an American blues-based band based in Iowa, and later in San Francisco, California. Linn County released three albums from 1968 to 1970. Over the course of their existence, they had seven band members.

History 
Linn County formed around 1966 in Linn County, Iowa, United States as the Prophets. In 1968, the band signed with Mercury Records, moved to San Francisco, and changed its name to Linn County. They released their first album Proud Flesh Soothseer in 1968, and toured performing with bands and musicians such as Albert King, Led Zeppelin, Sly & the Family Stone, Eric Burdon & the Animals and Ten Years After. They were becoming more well known when the group broke up shortly after Clark Pierson left to join Janis Joplin and Stephen Miller left to join Elvin Bishop. Fred Walk kept the band together with different personnel for a time then disbanded the group in 1973. Linn County also headlined or played with Ike & Tina Turner, Earl Hooker, John Lee Hooker, Paul Butterfield, Bo Diddley, Howlin' Wolf, Elvin Bishop, Charlie Musselwhite, Steve Miller, Albert Collins and a host of others during music festivals.

Members

Discography 
 Proud Flesh Soothseer 1968
 Fever Shot 1969
 Till The Break Of Dawn 1970

References

Bibliography
 Roxon, Lillian: Lilian Roxon's Rock Encyclopedia (Grosset and Dunlop, Universal Library Edition, 1972) p. 297

External links
 Linn County Discography. Grateful Dead Family Discography. Retrieved on 2008-07-21.
 Fred Walk. Iowa Blues Hall of Fame. Retrieved on 2008-07-21.

Musical groups from Iowa
Musical groups established in 1966
Musical groups from San Francisco